Polyommatus ardschira is a butterfly in the family Lycaenidae. It was described by W. Brandt in 1938. It is found in the Elburz Mountains.

References

Butterflies described in 1938
Polyommatus
Butterflies of Asia